C7, C07 or C-7 may refer to:

Vehicles (including military)
 C-7 Caribou, a military transport aircraft
 AEG C.VII, a World War I German armed reconnaissance aircraft
 AGO C.VII, a World War I German reconnaissance aircraft
 Albatros C.VII, a World War I German military reconnaissance aircraft
 C-7, a United States Navy C class blimp and the first airship inflated with helium
 Chevrolet Corvette (C7), the seventh generation of a sports car made by General Motors
 Fokker C.VII, a 1928 Dutch reconnaissance seaplane
 HMS C7, a British Royal Navy C-class submarine
 Sauber C7, a 1983 Group C prototype race car
 USS Cincinnati (C-7), a United States Navy protected cruiser

Science
 Caldwell 7 (NGC 2403), a spiral galaxy in Camelopardalis

Technology
 Nokia C7-00, a touch screen mobile from Nokia
 VIA C7, an IA-32 central processing unit by VIA Technologies
 C7, an incandescent light bulb of the size typically used in nightlights and Christmas lighting usually 2 and 1/8 inches Length, 7/8 inch Width, 5 watts
 IEC 60320 C7, an unpolarized, two pole, mains voltage connector

Biology
 Cervical vertebra 7 (vertebra prominens), one of the cervical vertebrae of the vertebral column
 Cervical spinal nerve 7
 C7 protein, engineered transcription factors
 Complement component 7, protein encoded by the C7 gene in humans
 Coccinella septempunctata ("C. 7-punctata"), a widespread lady beetle
 ATC code C07 Beta blocking agents, a subgroup of the Anatomical Therapeutic Chemical Classification System
 C07, Malignant neoplasm of parotid gland ICD-10 code

Entertainment
 "C7" (song), a song by Japanese band GO!GO!7188
 C7 Sport, a defunct pay-TV service in Australia
 C7, the C (musical note) three octaves above Middle C in scientific pitch notation
 C7, in music, a C dominant seventh chord

Communications
 C7, CCITT (now ITU-T) (the European term for) Signalling System No. 7, a set of telecom signaling protocols
 Nielsen ratings that include recorded programs watched a week later
 C7, broadcasting services of the government of the Mexican state of Jalisco:
 XEJB (disambiguation), radio
 XHGJG-TV, television
 Nokia C7-00, a cell phone

Transport
 C7, a road connecting Newhaven and Lewes in East Sussex
 The IATA code for Rico Linhas Aéreas, an airline based in Manaus, Brazil
 LNER Class C7, classified Z or V2 by the NER

Other
 Colt Canada C7 rifle or Diemaco C7, a Canadian derivative of the M16
 C7, an international standard paper size (81×114 mm), defined in ISO 216